Khanya Dilima (born 30 April 1999) is a South African cricketer. He made his List A debut on 28 February 2021, for Boland in the 2020–21 CSA Provincial One-Day Challenge. He made his Twenty20 debut on 4 October 2021, for Boland in the 2021–22 CSA Provincial T20 Knock-Out tournament.

References

External links
 

1999 births
Living people
South African cricketers
Boland cricketers
Place of birth missing (living people)